Melilla is one of the forty subbarrios of Santurce, San Juan, Puerto Rico.

Demographics
In 2000, Melilla had a population of 926.

In 2010, Melilla had a population of 785 and a population density of 15,700 persons per square mile.

See also
 
 List of communities in Puerto Rico

References

Santurce, San Juan, Puerto Rico
Municipality of San Juan